Castleton is a hamlet in the city of Newport, South Wales.

Location 
Castleton is in the Marshfield ward on the A48 dual carriageway located between the city of Newport to the east and Cardiff to the west.

Amenities 

Castleton has a Baptist chapel.  It was at the Castleton Baptist Association meeting in 1816 that it was resolved to build the first Welsh Baptist Chapel in Newport, and the land then acquired in Charles Street, with the help of a bequest from John Williams, a Newport tailor.  This building is now used as a business and Church meetings are held at Gateway Baptist in Marshfield nearby.  There is a filling station with a cafe and deli next door. Across the road, is the Coach and Horses, a pub/restaurant and hotel.

Transport

The A48 dual carriageway is the main road through Castleton. The A48(M) motorway passes close to the north of the village. There are no motorway junctions on this short link between (M4) Junction 29 and Junction 29A at St Mellons.

The Great Western Railway station at nearby Marshfield acted as a rail connection, eastwards to Newport and onwards through the Severn Tunnel, terminating at London Paddington, and westwards to Cardiff and Fishguard Harbour. Closed since 1959, long before the Beeching cuts took effect, the nearest rail stations today are Newport and Rogerstone.

References

External links 
Photos of Castleton and surrounding area on geograph.org.uk

Districts of Newport, Wales
Villages in Newport, Wales